Atsushi Nakamura is a Japanese professional football manager. He also previously managed the I-League club Sudeva Delhi.

Career

Nakamura started his managerial career with Japanese fifth tier side Nara Club, helping them win the league and earn promotion to the Japanese fourth tier. In 2017, he was appointed manager of Singburi in Thailand, but left due to unpaid wages. In 2018, Nakamura was appointed manager of Bhutan U20.

In 2020, he was appointed manager of Japanese fifth tier club Tochigi City FC, helping them win the league. In 2022, he was appointed manager of Sudeva Delhi in the Indian second tier, becoming the first Japanese manager in India.

References

Expatriate football managers in Bhutan
Expatriate football managers in India
Expatriate football managers in Thailand
Japanese expatriate football managers
Japanese expatriate sportspeople in Bhutan
Japanese expatriate sportspeople in India
Japanese expatriate sportspeople in Thailand
Japanese football managers
Living people
Nara Club managers
Sudeva Delhi FC managers
Year of birth missing (living people)